Ventes-Saint-Rémy is a commune in the Seine-Maritime department in the Normandy region in northern France.

Geography

Population

Places of interest
 The church of St. Remi, dating from the nineteenth century.
 The tomb of Charles Lemercier de Longpré, Baron d'Haussez, Navy Minister under Charles X of France.

See also
Communes of the Seine-Maritime department

References

Communes of Seine-Maritime